Air India Flight 182 was an Air India flight operating on the Montreal–London–Delhi–Bombay route. On 23 June 1985, it was operated using Boeing 747-237B registered VT-EFO. The bombing of Air India Flight 182 is the deadliest aviation incident in the history of Air India and was the world's deadliest act of aviation terrorism until the September 11 attacks in 2001.
Investigators found the attack was a part of a larger transnational terrorist plot and had included two attempted plane bombings. The first bomb was meant to explode aboard Air India Flight 301, which was scheduled to take off from Narita International Airport, Japan, but it exploded before it was loaded onto the plane. This bomb detonated early, killing two baggage handlers, because perpetrators failed to take into account that Japan does not observe daylight saving time. The second bomb planted aboard Air India Flight 182 in Canada was successful. It was eventually determined that both the plot and the bombs, which had been hidden inside luggage, had originated in Canada. The plan's execution had transnational consequences and involved citizens and governments from five nation states. The Babbar Khalsa separatist group was implicated in the bombings.

Although a handful of members were arrested and tried for the Air India bombing, the only person convicted was Inderjit Singh Reyat, a dual British-Canadian national and a member of the International Sikh Youth Federation (ISYF), who pleaded guilty in 2003 to manslaughter. He was sentenced to fifteen years in prison for assembling the bombs that exploded on board Air India Flight 182 and at Narita.

The subsequent investigation and prosecution lasted almost twenty years. This was the most expensive trial in Canadian history, costing nearly C$130 million. The Governor General-in-Council in 2006 appointed the former Supreme Court Justice John C. Major to conduct a commission of inquiry. His report, which was completed and released on 17 June 2010, concluded that a "cascading series of errors" by the Government of Canada, the Royal Canadian Mounted Police (RCMP), and the Canadian Security Intelligence Service (CSIS) had allowed the terrorist attack to take place.

Background

During the 1970s, many Sikhs emigrated to western Canada for better economic opportunities. These included men who later became leaders and members of the Babbar Khalsa including Talwinder Singh Parmar, Ajaib Singh Bagri, Ripudaman Singh Malik and Inderjit Singh Reyat. By the 1980s, the area around Vancouver, British Columbia, had become the largest centre of Sikh population outside India.

In India on 13 April 1978 a convention organised by the Sant Nirankari Mission took place at the time of the important Sikh festival of Vaisakhi, a celebration of the birth of Khalsa. The convention was led by Gurbachan Singh, leader of the Sant Nirankari Mission, and was organized in Amritsar with permission from the Akali Dal state government. The practices of the Sant Nirankari were considered heresy by the school of orthodox Sikhism expounded by Bhindranwale. A procession of about 200 Sikhs led by Bhindranwale and Fauja Singh of the Akhand Kirtani Jatha (AKJ) left the Golden Temple, the preeminent spiritual site of Sikhism, heading towards the Nirankari Convention. In the ensuing violence, several people were killed: two of Bhindranwale's followers, eleven members of the Akhand Kirtani Jatha and three Nirankaris.

A criminal case was filed against 62 Nirankaris who were charged by the Akali-led government in Punjab with the murder of 13 Sikhs. The case was heard in the neighbouring Haryana state, and all the accused were acquitted, on the basis that they acted in self-defence. The Punjab government decided not to appeal the decision. As a result of the Nirankaris receiving positive attention in the media, some orthodox Sikhs claimed this to be a conspiracy to defame the Sikh religion. Bhindranwale increased his rhetoric against the perceived enemies of Sikhs. A letter of authority was issued by Akal Takht to ostracize the Sant Nirankaris and created an environment where some of his followers felt justified to kill the perceived enemies of Sikhism. The chief proponents of this attitude were the Babbar Khalsa founded by the widow, Bibi Amarjit Kaur of the Akhand Kirtani Jatha; the Damdami Taksal led by Jarnail Singh Bhindranwale, who had also been in Amritsar on the day of the attack on the convention; the Dal Khalsa, formed with the object of demanding a sovereign Sikh state; and the All India Sikh Students Federation, which was banned by the government.

The founders of this Panthan group (sect) in Vancouver vowed to avenge the deaths of Sikhs. Talwinder Singh Parmar led the militant wing of AKJ, which became the Babbar Khalsa, to attack the Nirankaris. On 24 April 1980 Gurbachan Singh, the Baba (head) of the Nirankaris, was killed. A member of the Akhand Kirtani Jatha, Ranjit Singh, surrendered and admitted to the assassination three years later, and was sentenced to serve thirteen years at the Tihar Jail in Delhi.

On 19 November 1981, Parmar was among the alleged terrorists who escaped from a shootout in which two Punjab Police officers were gunned down outside the house of Amarjit Singh Nihang in Ludhiana district. This added to the notoriety of Babbar Khalsa and its leader. He went to Canada. In 1982, India issued a warrant for Parmar's arrest for six charges of murder, stemming from the killing of the police officers. India notified Canada that Parmar was a wanted terrorist in 1981 and asked for his extradition in 1982. Canada denied the request in July 1982.

After an Interpol alert, Parmar was arrested while attempting to enter West Germany. West Germany chose to handle the case locally rather than transfer him over to India. Parmar went on a hunger strike to win his religious right to wear a turban and have vegetarian meals in the Düsseldorf jail. After India received information that Parmar had made assassination threats against Indira Gandhi, they found that Germany had decided that the evidence was weak.

In 1983, rebels led by Damdami Taksal Jathedar (leader) Jarnail Singh Bhindranwale had occupied Akal Takht of Golden Temple and amassed weapons in the Sikh temple. They passed the Anandpur Sahib Resolution, which demanded more powers to the state from Central government and autonomy by changes in the Indian constitution. The total number of deaths was 410 in violent incidents and riots while 1,180 people were injured. The Central government rejected the secessionist demands and on 3–6 June 1984, Prime Minister of India Indira Gandhi ordered Operation Blue Star, to remove the militants from the Golden Temple. Sikhs protested against the operation worldwide. On 31 October 1984, Indira Gandhi was assassinated by two of her Sikh bodyguards. In retaliation, the 1984 anti-Sikh riots, guided by certain Indian National Congress members, killed thousands of Sikhs in India.

Preparation

Parmar visited Inderjit Singh Reyat, an auto mechanic and electrician who lived in Duncan, British Columbia, a small community north of Victoria on Vancouver Island. He asked him to construct a bomb; Reyat later claimed he had no idea for what it would be used. Reyat asked various people in the community about dynamite, saying he wanted to remove tree stumps on his property. Reyat also discussed explosives with a co-worker, while expressing anger at the Indian government and Indira Gandhi in particular.

Later that year, Ajaib Singh Bagri accompanied Parmar as his right-hand man in the militancy against the Indian government. Bagri worked as a forklift driver at a sawmill near the town of Kamloops. He was known as a powerful preacher in the Indo-Canadian community. The pair travelled across Canada to incite Sikhs against the Indian government for conducting Operation Blue Star. They used the meetings as fundraisers for Babbar Khalsa. A former head priest in Hamilton testified that Bagri said, "The Indian Government is our enemy, the same way the Hindu society is our enemy." Bagri told a congregation, "Get your weapons ready so we can take revenge against the Indian Government".

Bagri speech

On 28 July 1984, the founding convention of the World Sikh Organization (WSO) was held at Madison Square Garden in New York City. The WSO's constitution was committed to diplomacy and non-violence, and it said the organisation would "strive for an independent Sikh homeland by peaceful means." Although Parmar was blocked at the border (he had been put under 24-hour watch), Bagri gave an hour-long speech at the convention.

He said, "until we kill 50,000 Hindus, we will not rest," before a crowd of 4,000 people; this statement was quoted against him at his later trial. Bagri defended hijackers who had forced the 'hated' Indian government into negotiations with the Sikh leadership, and was critical of Gandhian non-violence. "We are to die in the battlefield, fighting, by sacrificing ourselves. To die such a death, which is the mission of the Khalsa, is our religion". Jammu Kashmir Liberation Front  members and Afghan mujahideen were also invited to the rally. An Afghan mujahid said, "We will bring together all movements against India because India allies itself with the Soviet Union." (At the time, the Soviet–Afghan War was underway, and many foreign mujahideen had gone to Afghanistan to help the Muslims.)

A professional translator testified later as a witness that Bagri's speech in Punjabi had been distorted by observers who failed to understand "its context within Sikh history and literature;" he denied that Bagri had urged Sikhs to take revenge against all Hindus. He conceded that Bagri was trying to "inflame passions and arouse national pride".

Plot preparations
In late 1984, at least two informers reported to authorities on the first abortive plot to bomb Air India Flight 182, which then flew out of Montreal's Mirabel International Airport. In August 1984, the known criminal Gerry Boudreault claimed that Talwinder Parmar showed him a suitcase stuffed with $200,000 payment if he would plant a bomb on a plane. He decided, "I had done some bad things in my time, done my time in jail, but putting a bomb on a plane ... not me. I went to the police." In September, in an attempt to get his sentence for theft and fraud reduced, Harmail Singh Grewal of Vancouver told the Canadian Security Intelligence Service (CSIS) and the Royal Canadian Mounted Police (RCMP) of the plot to bomb the flight from Montreal. Both reports were dismissed as unreliable.

The moderate Sikh Ujjal Dosanjh had spoken out against violence by Sikh extremists. He was attacked in February 1985 by an assailant wielding an iron bar. His skull was broken and he required 80 stitches in his head. On 5 March 1985, three months before the bombing, the CSIS obtained a court order to place Parmar under surveillance for one year. Although the Babbar Khalsa had not yet been officially banned, the affidavit for surveillance stated, it "is a Sikh terrorist group now established in Canada", it "has claimed responsibility for more than forty assassinations of moderate Sikhs and other persons in the Punjab," and "penned its name to threatening letters [addressed to] ... high officials in India". The affidavit said that on 15 July 1984, Parmar urged the Coach Temple congregation of Calgary, Alberta, to "unite, fight and kill" to avenge the attack on the Golden Temple.

Explosives and clocks
In April 1985, a Canadian familiar with blasting was asked by Reyat how much dynamite it would take to blow up a tree stump. Reyat asked numerous people in Duncan about explosives, and expressed the need for revenge. Reyat sought cases of dynamite and appeared willing to pay three times the normal price. He eventually confided to one acquaintance that it was not about stumps, but "trouble in the old country", that he needed "explosives to help my countrymen." One friend declined to get him dynamite, but did lend him a 400-page manual on mining with explosives.

On 8 May 1985, Reyat bought a Micronta digital automobile clock at the RadioShack store in Duncan. Designed for a 12-volt automobile electrical system, it could also be powered by a 12-volt lantern battery. The 24-hour alarm activated a buzzer. Reyat returned to the store a week later to buy an electrical relay, after asking how to get the buzzer signal to power another device. Wiretappers recorded nine telephone calls in one month between Reyat and Parmar's residence in Vancouver; Reyat called either from his residence or workplace on Vancouver Island. As a result of this activity, the government added Reyat to the list of persons being monitored for terrorist activities. The Canadian government would later accuse Reyat of lying in 2003, when at first he said he did not know for what the three clocks he had bought could be used. He later said Parmar needed an explosive device to blow up a bridge or something large in India, and that he needed timers for an explosive device. The relay could be used to trigger the detonator circuit for a blasting cap, which would provide the initial shock needed to detonate larger explosives, such as dynamite.

Reyat later visited a television repair shop, seeking help for a partially disassembled car clock wired to a lantern battery. He claimed that he needed help so that the buzzer stayed on rather than intermittently beeping, so that it would turn on a light in his camper to wake him up. The repairman knew his friend did not own a camper. Justice J. Raymond Paris said at Reyat's 1991 trial that this was an odd use for a timer.

Bomb tests
By mid-May, Reyat had gone into the woods to test a device with a 12-volt battery, cardboard cylinder, gunpowder, and some dynamite, but the device failed to work. The wooded area was in proximity to Duncan and Paldi. Later, Reyat acquired between six and eight sticks of dynamite "to blow up unidentified stumps if need be in the future" from a Duncan well driller after visiting his house to fix a truck. He also obtained a few blasting caps days later. On 31 May 1985, Reyat brought his timer, attached to a boombox, into his shop so that his fellow employee at Duncan Auto Marine Electric could help him fix it for a friend, but he returned the radio after it did not work properly.

On 4 June, CSIS agents Larry Lowe and Lynn Macadams followed Parmar and a "youthful man" (identified only as "Mr. X", "Third Man" or "Unknown Male") as they went from Parmar's house to the Horseshoe Bay Ferry Terminal, rode the Nanaimo-bound ferry, and visited Reyat at his home and shop at Auto Marine Electric. The three drove to a deserted bush area, where Reyat was observed taking an object into the woods. Staying out of sight, the agents, who did not bring a camera, only heard a bang which sounded like a "loud gunshot". Later tests showed it could also have been an explosion, and later searches turned up remnants of an aluminium "electrical blasting cap". J.S. Warren, director-general of counter-terrorism at CSIS, would later ask on 16 July 1986 why they did not ask the police to stop and question the suspects, or search the vehicle, which might have deterred the bombing plot.

The next day, Reyat purchased a large Sanyo component tuner, model FMT 611 K, at Woolworths, and left his name and telephone number on the charge slip, which was later found in a search of his home. Reyat also bought smokeless gunpowder from a sporting goods store, signing "I. Reyat" on the explosives log. Study of debris from the Narita explosion would eventually show the bomb had been housed inside a Sanyo tuner with a serial number matching a model sold only in British Columbia, and used a Micronta clock as a timer, which powered a relay with an Eveready 12-volt battery to trigger blasting caps to set off a high explosive consistent with sticks of dynamite, all matching items purchased by Reyat. This would lead to his eventual conviction. As late as 2010, Reyat admitted only to buying and assembling some parts, but denied he ever made a bomb, knew what the bomb was to be used for, who was behind any plot, or that he ever asked or knew the name of the man who he said stayed in his house for a week completing construction of the explosive device after his device failed.

On 9 June 1985, a police informer in Hamilton reported that Parmar and Bagri had visited the Malton Sikh Temple, warning the faithful that "it would be unsafe" to fly Air India. Vancouver police also monitored militants 11 days before the bombing. A leader of the International Sikh Youth Federation complained that no Indian consuls or ambassadors had yet been killed, but the response was, "You will see. Something will be done in two weeks".

Tickets
The suspects in the bombing used pay phones and talked in code. Translators' notes of wiretapped conversations include the following exchange between Talwinder Parmar and a follower named Hardial Singh Johal on 20 June 1985, the day the tickets were purchased:

Parmar: Did you write the story?
Johal: .
Parmar: Do that work first.

This conversation appears to be an order from Parmar to book the airline tickets. It is believed that "writing the story" referred to purchasing the tickets; afterward, Johal phoned Parmar back and asked if he could "come over and read the story he asked for", to which Parmar agreed.

Moments after the wiretapped conversation, at 01:00 UTC, a man calling himself "Mr. Singh" made reservations for two flights on 22 June: one for "Jaswant Singh" to fly from Vancouver to Toronto on Canadian Pacific Air Lines (CP) Flight 086 and one for "Mohinderbel Singh" to fly from Vancouver to Tokyo on Canadian Pacific Air Lines Flight 003 and connect to Air India Flight 301 to Bangkok. At 02:20 UTC on the same day, another call changed the reservation in the name of "Jaswant Singh" from CP 086 to CP 060, also flying from Vancouver to Toronto. The caller further requested to be put on the waiting list for AI 181 from Toronto to Montreal and AI 182 from Montreal to Bombay. The next day, at 19:10 UTC, a man wearing a turban paid for the two tickets with $3,005 in cash at a CP ticket office in Vancouver. The names on the reservations were changed: "Jaswant Singh" became "M. Singh" and "Mohinderbel Singh" became "L. Singh". The reservation and purchase of these tickets together would be used as evidence to link the two flights to one plot.

One telephone number left as a contact was Vancouver's Ross Street Sikh temple. The other number became one of the first leads tracked by investigators, and was traced to Hardial Singh Johal, a janitor at a Vancouver high school. Johal was an avid follower of Talwinder Singh Parmar, and thus closely scrutinised in the investigation following the Air India bombing. He was alleged to have stored the suitcase explosives in the basement of a Vancouver school and to have purchased the tickets for the flights on which the bombs were placed. Mandip Singh Grewal recounted how he saw and recognised Johal as his school's janitor when he said goodbye to his father, one of the Flight 182 victims, at the airport on the day of the bombing.

Reyat went to work on 21 June. Phone records show he called Johal at 7:17 p.m. A witness whose name was protected testified that Bagri asked to borrow her car the night before the bombing to take some suitcases to the airport, though he would not be flying with them.

Aircraft

The aircraft operating the flight was a Boeing 747-237B, registered VT-EFO; and named Emperor Kanishka. The aircraft had its first flight on 30 June 1978 and was delivered to Air India in July, 1978.

Bombings
On 22 June 1985, at 13:30 UTC (6:30 a.m. PDT) a man calling himself "Manjit Singh" (checked in as M. Singh) called to confirm his reservations on Air India Flight 181/182. He was told he was still wait-listed, and was offered alternative arrangements, which he declined. At 15:50 UTC (8:50 a.m.), M. Singh checked into a busy line of 30 people for the CP flight from Vancouver to Toronto, which was scheduled to leave at 9:18 a.m. He asked agent Jeannie Adams to check his dark brown, hard-sided Samsonite suitcase, and have it transferred to Air India Flight 181 and then to Flight 182 to India. The agent initially refused his request to inter-line the baggage since his seat from Toronto to Montreal and from Montreal to Bombay was unconfirmed. He insisted, but the agent again rebuffed him, telling him, "Your ticket doesn't read that you're confirmed" and "we're not supposed to check your baggage through." The man said, "Wait, I'll get my brother for you." As he started to walk away, she relented and agreed to accept the bag, but told him he would have to check in again with Air India in Toronto. After the mass murders, Adams would realise this deception got the bag on its way to Flight 182. The anxious man was never identified. At 16:18 UTC (9:18 a.m.), Canadian Pacific Air Lines Flight 60 to Toronto Pearson International Airport departed without Singh.

Reyat would later testify that he travelled by ferry from Duncan to Vancouver that morning to work on his brother's truck. Phone records show someone called from his residence in Duncan to Johal's number at 10:50 a.m. and 4:00 p.m. later that day. Reyat was seen in the company of another East Indian man at the Auto Marine Electric store in Burnaby, near Parmar's house, between 10:00 a.m. and 11:30 a.m. He bought two 12 volt batteries similar to the one used in the explosive device tested in the woods, and they were to fit into a special metal bracket he had brought with him. Constable Clark-Marlowe later believed there was "ample time for Inderjit Singh Reyat to obtain the batteries at the Auto Marine Electric limited store in Burnaby, incorporate the batteries in the assembly of an explosive device and then have the device transported in a suitcase to the Vancouver airport".

At 20:22 UTC (4:22 p.m. EDT), Canadian Pacific Air Lines Flight 60 arrived in Toronto twelve minutes late. Some of the passengers and baggage, including the bag M. Singh had checked in, were transferred to Air India Flight 182. In response to threats from Sikh activists, Air India had requested extra security, leading Canada to assign extra policemen in terminals in Toronto and Montreal, and all baggage was to be checked by X-ray or by hand. But after the x-ray machine broke down that day, inspectors used a portable PDD-4 explosive sniffer. An Air India security officer had demonstrated that it made a loud scream when a lit match was held an inch away, and showed that it should be used around the edge of the bag being tested. Between 5:15 and 6:00, the sniffer was heard to beep at a soft-sided maroon suitcase with a zipper going all around; it beeped in a low volume near the zipper lock. But Air India was not informed since checkers were not instructed on how to react to only a short beep, so they allowed the bag to pass on its way. Later investigation would determine that the two containers that could have contained M. Singh's bag were placed close to the sensitive electronic bay of the aircraft.

At 00:15 UTC (8:15 p.m., 22 June) on 23 June, Air India Flight 181, a Boeing 747-237B named Emperor Kanishka, departed Toronto Pearson International Airport for Montréal–Mirabel International Airport. The aircraft was an hour and 40 minutes late because a "fifth pod" (a spare engine) was installed under the aircraft below the left wing to be flown to India for repairs. Some of the parts had to be stored in the rear cargo compartment. The 5th pod engine was a serviceable spare engine that had been on lease to Air Canada after one of their Boeing 747s suffered an engine failure on the way to India. That engine received a post lease inspection and was declared serviceable by Air Canada personnel.

The plane arrived in Montréal-Mirabel International Airport at 01:00 UTC (9:00 p.m., 22 June). There, it became Flight 182. Flight 182 departed for London Heathrow Airport, en route to Palam International Airport, Delhi, and Sahar International Airport, Bombay. Three hundred and twenty-nine people were on board: 307 passengers and 22 crew. Captain Hanse Singh Narendra (56) served as the captain, with Captain Satwinder Singh Bhinder (41) as the first officer and Dara Dumasia (57) as the flight engineer. Many of the passengers were going to visit family and friends.

At 07:09:58 GMT (8:09:58 a.m. Irish time), the crew of the Boeing 747 "squawked 2005" (a routine activation of its aviation transponder) as requested by Shannon Airport Air Traffic Control (ATC), then vanished from the radar screens at 07:14:01 GMT (8:14:01 a.m. Irish time). It caused explosive decompression and the break-up of the aircraft in mid-air. No "mayday" call was received by Shannon ATC. ATC asked aircraft in the area to try to contact Air India, to no avail. By 07:30:00 GMT, ATC had declared an emergency and requested nearby cargo ships and the Irish Naval Service vessel LÉ Aisling to look out for the aircraft.

Meanwhile, sometime before 20:22 UTC (1:22 p.m. PDT), L. Singh (also never identified) checked in for the 1:37 p.m. CP Air Flight 003 to Tokyo with one piece of luggage, which was to be transferred to Air India Flight 301 to Bangkok. However, L. Singh did not board the flight.
The second bag checked in by L. Singh went on Canadian Pacific Air Lines Flight 003 from Vancouver to Tokyo. There were no x-ray inspections of luggage on this flight. Its target was Air India Flight 301, due to leave with 177 passengers and crew bound for Bangkok-Don Mueang, but 55 minutes before the Flight 182 bombing, it exploded at the terminal in Narita International Airport. Two Japanese baggage handlers were killed and four other people were injured. It appears the conspirators meant for both bombings to occur simultaneously, but they neglected to take into account that Japan does not observe daylight saving time, as Canada does.

Recovery of wreckage and bodies

By 09:13 UTC, the cargo ship Laurentian Forest discovered wreckage of the aircraft and many bodies floating in the water. India's civil aviation minister announced the possibility that the plane had been destroyed by a bomb, and the cause was probably some sort of explosion. Previous 747s had been damaged or destroyed on the ground, but this was the first jumbo jet downed by sabotage.

The bomb killed all 22 crew and 307 passengers. Of those, 132 bodies were recovered; 197 were lost at sea. Eight bodies exhibited "flail pattern" injuries, indicating that they had exited the aircraft before it hit the water. This was a sign that the aircraft had broken up in mid-air. Twenty-six bodies showed signs of hypoxia (lack of oxygen). Twenty-five, mostly victims who were seated near windows, showed signs of explosive decompression. Twenty-three had signs of "injuries from a vertical force". Twenty-one passengers were found with little or no clothing.

One official quoted in the report stated:

Two of these drowning victims, a pregnant woman in her second trimester and her unborn son, were described by Dr. John Hogan in testimony given at a coroner's inquest convened in Cork on 17 September 1985:

The British vessel Gardline Locater, equipped with sophisticated sonar, and the French cable-laying vessel Léon Thévenin, with its remotely operated underwater vehicle Scarab 1, were dispatched to locate the flight data recorder (FDR) and cockpit voice recorder (CVR) boxes. The boxes would be difficult to find and it was imperative that the search commence quickly. By 4 July, Gardline Locator detected signals on the sea bed. On 9 July, Scarab 1 pinpointed the CVR and raised it to the surface. The next day, the FDR was also located and recovered. In 1985, the Canadian Coast Guard Ship (CCGS) John Cabot participated in the investigations, mapping the underwater wreckage of the aircraft.

Victims

A casualty list was provided by the Canadian Broadcasting Corporation. The victims included 268 Canadians, 27 Britons, 22 Indians, and 12 people of undetermined nationality. Canadians of Indian descent made up the majority of the passengers.

Between 82 and 86 passengers were children, including six infants. There were 29 entire families on the plane. Two children not on board had both parents on board, resulting in them becoming orphaned. There were six sets of children of their entire families. There were 32 people not on the aircraft who had the remaining members of their families on board.

Most of the victims resided in southern Ontario and were Hindus. Some of the victims were Sikhs; around 35 passengers were Sikhs from Greater Montreal. In terms of metropolitan areas, the Greater Toronto Area was the home of the majority of the passengers, with Greater Montreal also having the next largest number of passengers. Some passengers originated from British Columbia. Forty-five passengers were employees of Air India or relatives of Air India employees. Notable passengers and crew included Inder Thakur, an Air India purser and former actor along with his wife and son; and Yelavarthy Nayudamma, a scientist and chemical engineer.

105 passengers boarded the flight at Mirabel Airport, while 202 passengers who travelled on Flight 182 had boarded at Toronto Pearson Airport. The report stated that interlining passengers boarding Flight 181 in Toronto who became passengers on Flight 182 included ten passengers connecting from Vancouver, five passengers from Winnipeg, four passengers from Edmonton, and two passengers from Saskatoon. It stated that all of these passengers had taken flights on Air Canada, and no interlining passengers boarded Flight 182 in Montreal. In the documentary Air India 182, Renée Sarojini Saklikar stated that her aunt and uncle had taken a Canadian Pacific Air Lines flight from Vancouver to connect to Air India 182; the two were on AI182 while it was in Montreal. The flight crew and cabin crew of Flight 182 had boarded in Toronto and commanded the segment of Flight 181 from Toronto to Montreal.

There were 68 persons who cleared customs in Toronto and were scheduled to re-board Flight 181 so they could travel to their final destination, Montreal. There was a practice of passengers who intended to fly to Toronto actually buying tickets to Montreal, because tickets to Montreal had a lower cost than tickets to Toronto. On the flights going to Canada, such passengers simply disembarked in Toronto and chose not to re-board the flight to Montreal. Three passengers scheduled to go onward to Montreal never re-boarded Flight 181, and so there were 65 passengers destined for Montreal who flew the Toronto-to-Montreal segment.

Investigations

Within hours, Canada's Indian community was a focus of attention as victims and among hints that officials were investigating connections to the Sikh separatists who had threatened and committed acts of violence in retaliation against Hindus.

In the subsequent worldwide investigations over six years, many threads of the plot were uncovered. Based on recovery of wreckage and bodies from the surface, it was decided to retrieve wreckage and recorders from the bottom of the sea. That voice and flight recorders were cut out at the same time, and damage to parts recovered from the forward cargo bay consistent with a blast, established that it was probably a bomb near the forward cargo hold that brought the plane down suddenly. The flight was also soon linked to the earlier bombing in Japan which had also originated from Vancouver; tickets for both flights had been purchased by the same person, and in both cases the planes were carrying bags without the passenger who checked them in.

One of the problems the investigators thought may have been the reason of the supposed crash was that the aircraft was carrying a spare engine. Therefore, there would have been more weight on one side. This reason was ruled out as the flight recorders relayed information of the rudder position which assists in the carrying of a 5th engine. Carrying a 5th engine helped airlines carry broken engines back to be maintained.

No bomb parts were recovered from the ocean, but investigations of the blast at Tokyo established that the bomb had been placed in a Sanyo stereo tuner of a series that had been shipped to Vancouver in Canada. The RCMP assigned no less than 135 officers to check every store that could have sold Sanyo tuners, leading to the discovery of a recent sale to mechanic Inderjit Singh Reyat in his hometown of Duncan, British Columbia. RCMP contacted the CSIS and found they were already investigating the Sikh activists; RCMP learned that CSIS already had wiretaps and had observed Reyat and Parmar at the test blast near Duncan, and had recovered blasting cap shunts and a paper bundle wrapper from a blasting cap. A search recovered the receipt for a Sanyo Tuner Model FMT-611K with invoice with his name and phone number, along with sales of other bomb components. It was not until January 1986 that Canadian investigators at the Canadian Aviation Safety Board concluded that a bomb explosion in the forward cargo hold had downed the airliner. On 26 February 1986, Supreme Court Judge Kirpal of India presented an inquiry report based on investigation conducted by H.S. Khola (the "Khola Report"). The report also concluded that a bomb originating in Canada brought down the Air India flight.

Based on observations, wiretaps, searches and arrests of persons believed to be participants, the bombing was determined to be the joint project of at least two Sikh terrorist groups with extensive membership in Canada, the United States, Britain and India. Militant Sikhs were angered by the destruction of the Golden Temple and deaths of Sikhs during India's ground assault on separatists, as well as the 1984 anti-Sikh riots.

Suspects
The multiple suspects in the bombing were members of a Khalistani group called the Babbar Khalsa (banned in Europe and the United States as a proscribed terrorist group) and other related groups who were at the time agitating for a separate Sikh state (called Khalistan) in Punjab, India.
 Talwinder Singh Parmar (26 February 1944 – 15 October 1992) – a Canadian citizen born in Punjab and living in British Columbia, was a high-ranking official in the Babbar Khalsa. His phone was tapped by CSIS for three months before the bombing. He was killed by the Punjab police 15 October 1992 in an encounter with six other terrorists.
 Inderjit Singh Reyat (born 11 March 1952) – was born in India, but moved to the United Kingdom with his family in 1965 and later to Canada in 1974, and holds dual British and Canadian citizenship. He worked as an auto mechanic and electrician in Duncan, British Columbia on Vancouver Island. Investigation of the bombing in Tokyo led to discovery that he had bought a Sanyo radio, clocks and other parts found after the blast. He was convicted of manslaughter for constructing the bomb. As part of a deal, he was to testify against others, but as he declined to implicate others, he would be the only suspect convicted in the case. Reyat was released to halfway house in 2016 and now fully released with some restrictions since early 2017 to his family's home in BC.
 Ajaib Singh Bagri (4 October 1949 – 14 July 2022) – a mill worker living in Kamloops. During the founding convention of the World Sikh Organization in New York in 1984, Bagri gave a speech in which he proclaimed that, "until we kill 50,000 Hindus, we will not rest." He and Ripudaman Singh Malik (4 February 1947 – 14 July 2022) were acquitted in 2005. Bagri was living in Kamloops as of 2011. In July 2022, Malik was murdered in a targeted attack in Surrey, British Columbia.
 Surjan Singh Gill (born 19 October 1942) – was living in Vancouver as the self-proclaimed consul-general of Khalistan. Some RCMP testimony claimed he was a mole who left the plot just days before its execution because he was told to pull out, but the Canadian government denied that report. He later fled Canada and was believed in August 2003 to be hiding in London, England.
 Hardial Singh Johal (born 20 November 1946 - 15 November 2002) – a follower of Parmar who was active in the Gurdwaras where Parmar preached. On 15 November 2002, Johal died of natural causes at age 55. His phone number was left when ordering the airline tickets, he was seen at the airport the day the luggage was loaded, and he had allegedly stored the suitcases containing the bombs in the basement of a Vancouver school, but was never charged in the case.
 Daljit Sandhu –  named by a Crown witness as the man who picked up the tickets. During the trial, the Crown played a video from January 1989 in which Sandhu congratulated the families of Indira Gandhi's assassins and stated that "she deserved that and she invited that and that's why she got it." Sandhu was cleared by Judge Ian Josephson in a 16 March judgment.
 Lakhbir Singh Rode – the leader of the Sikh separatist organisation International Sikh Youth Federation. In September 2007, the commission investigated reports, initially disclosed in the Indian investigative news magazine Tehelka, that Parmar had allegedly confessed and named the hitherto-unnamed Lakhbir Singh Rode as the mastermind behind the explosions. This claim appears to be inconsistent with other evidence known to the RCMP.

On 17 August 1985, Reyat became a third suspect once the receipt for the tuner was found with his name. On 6 November 1985, the RCMP raided the homes of Parmar, Reyat, Gill and Johal. In a -hour interview, Reyat denied all knowledge of the test blast or even Parmar. After he was told the CSIS had seen both of them, he changed his story that Parmar really wanted to build a device powerful enough so that he could take the device back to India to destroy a bridge. He explained that the gunpowder in the test was a failure, as the device fizzled. The search of Reyat's house produced a carton with an unusual green tape also found in the Narita blast and a can of Liquid Fire-brand starting fluid matching fragments found at the blast site, along with blasting caps and dynamite, including a pound of dynamite in a bag taken out its original tube casing, though none was consistent with blast residue. Reyat insisted only the clock, relays and tuner had been purchased for other than "benign purposes". There was insufficient evidence to hold Parmar as charges were dropped days later.

Bagri would later state before his later trial that he knew he was probably a suspect by October 1985, but insisted he would have faced charges if there were any evidence he had anything to do with the bombing. It was established by November that it was a man with a Sikh name who probably checked the bag in Vancouver that caused the crash. Parmar was not seen in Canada sometime after late 1986, as authorities believed him to be living in Pakistan where he continued operations against India.

Trials
Authorities initially lacked evidence to link Inderjit Singh Reyat directly to either the Narita or Air India blasts and pursue a conspiracy to commit murder charge. Instead, Reyat pleaded guilty on 29 April 1986 to possession of an explosive substance and possession of an unregistered firearm. His sentence was a light $2,000 fine. Just three months later, Reyat moved his family from Canada to Coventry, near Birmingham, in the UK. Reyat was soon hired at a Jaguar factory where he worked for nearly two years.

Mounties working with prosecutor Jardine and RCMP and Japanese experts eventually determined the components of the bomb from fragments and matched them with items that Reyat possessed or had purchased. Prosecutor Jardine visited Tokyo five times to meet with Japanese authorities, and Canada formally asked that evidence to be sent to Canada. Still lacking sufficient evidence for a murder charge, Jardine recommended two manslaughter charges and five explosives-related counts, resulting in a request to Britain to extradite Reyat, who was arrested on 5 February 1988 as he was driving to the Jaguar car plant. After lengthy proceedings to extradite him from Britain, Reyat was flown to Vancouver on 13 December 1989 and his trial began 18 September 1990. On 10 May 1991, he was convicted of two counts of manslaughter and four explosives charges relating to the Narita Airport bombing. He was sentenced to 10 years' imprisonment.

Fifteen years after the bombing, on 27 October 2000, RCMP arrested Malik and Bagri. They were charged with 329 counts of first-degree murder in the deaths of the people on board Air India Flight 182, conspiracy to commit murder, the attempted murder of passengers and crew on the Canadian Pacific flight at Japan's New Tokyo International Airport (now Narita International Airport), and two counts of murder of the baggage handlers at New Tokyo International Airport. It became known as the "Air India Trial".

On 6 June 2001, RCMP arrested Reyat, who about to finish his earlier 10-year-sentence, on charges of murder, attempted murder, and conspiracy in the Air India bombing. On 10 February 2003, Reyat pleaded guilty to one count of manslaughter for aiding in the construction of a bomb. He was sentenced to five years in prison. The court claimed Reyat was guilty of helping make of the bomb, but that he lacked any knowledge of how it would be used and lacked an intent to kill. He was expected to provide testimony in the trial of Malik and Bagri, but prosecutors were vague.

The trial of Malik and Bagri proceeded between April 2003 and December 2004 in Courtroom 20, more commonly known as "the Air India courtroom". At a cost of $7.2 million, the high-security courtroom was specially built for the trial in the Vancouver Law Courts. On 16 March 2005, Justice Ian Josephson found the two accused not guilty on all counts because the evidence was inadequate:

In a letter to the Attorney General of British Columbia, Malik demanded compensation from the Canadian government for wrongful prosecution in his arrest and trial. Malik owes the government $6.4 million and Bagri owes $9.7 million in legal fees.
On July 14, 2022, Ripudaman Singh Malik, one of the men acquitted in the 1985 Air India terrorist bombings, was shot to death in Surrey, B.C.

Reyat's perjury trial
In February 2006, Inderjit Singh Reyat was charged with perjury with regard to his testimony in the trial. The indictment was filed in the Supreme Court of British Columbia and lists 27 instances in which Reyat allegedly misled the court during his testimony. Reyat had pleaded guilty to constructing the bomb, but denied under oath that he knew anything about the conspiracy.

In the verdict, Justice Josephson said:

On 3 July 2007, with perjury proceedings still pending, Reyat was denied parole by the National Parole Board, which concluded he was a continued risk to the public. The decision meant Reyat had to serve his full five-year sentence, which ended 9 February 2008.

Reyat's perjury trial began in March 2010 in Vancouver, but was abruptly dismissed on 8 March 2010. The jury was dismissed after "biased" remarks about Reyat by a woman juror.

A new jury was chosen. In September 2010, according to the Lethbridge Herald newspaper, jurors were told Reyat had lied 19 times under oath. On 19 September 2010, Reyat was convicted of perjury.

On 7 January 2011, he was sentenced to 9 years in prison by Justice Mark McEwan, who remarked that Reyat "behaved nothing like a remorseful man unwittingly implicated in mass murder," adding that, "[i]n the witness box, Mr. Reyat behaved like a man still committed to a cause which treated hundreds of men, women and children [as] expendable." In February 2011, Reyat filed an appeal stating that the judge "erred in law, misdirected the jury and failed to tell jurors there was no evidence to support portions of the Crown's closing address," and called it "harsh and excessive," asking for a new trial.

In January 2013, the Supreme Court of Canada rejected Reyat's bid to appeal his perjury conviction. The country's top court did not disclose its reasons as per customary practice.

In March 2014, the British Columbia Court of Appeal dismissed Reyat's appeal that the 9-year length of the sentence, the country's longest sentence for perjury, was unfit. The court ruled the gravity of the perjury in such a case was without comparison.

Parole
On 28 January 2016, Inderjit Singh Reyat was released on parole. He was released from a halfway house less than 13 months later, on 14 February 2017, with restrictions.

Mistakes and missed opportunities

Previous warning
The Canadian government had been warned by the Indian R&AW about the possibility of terrorist bombs aboard Air India flights in Canada, and over two weeks before the crash, CSIS reported to the RCMP that the potential threat to Air India as well as Indian missions in Canada was high.

In June 1985, there was an Air India telex message that suggested planes could be targeted by "time delay devices." Lieutenant-Governor of Ontario James Bartleman also testified that, as a senior intelligence official in the federal Department of External Affairs, he saw a security "intercept" with a specific warning of a threat against the airline on the weekend of the bombing.

Destroyed evidence
In his verdict, Justice Ian Josephson cited "unacceptable negligence" by CSIS when hundreds of wiretaps of the suspects and other informants were destroyed. Of the 210 wiretaps that were recorded during the months before and after the bombing, 156 were erased. These tapes continued to be erased even after the terrorists had become the primary suspects in the bombing.

Because the original wiretap records were erased, they were inadmissible as evidence in court. CSIS claimed the wiretap recordings contained no relevant information, but an RCMP memo states that "There is a strong likelihood that had CSIS retained the tapes between March and August 1985, that a successful prosecution of at least some of principals in both bombings could have been undertaken." "The CSIS investigation was so badly bungled that there was a near mutiny by CSIS officers involved in the probe," said the agent who destroyed the tapes once he had been granted anonymity in January 2000 by Globe and Mail journalists. One agent "said he felt compelled to destroy the tapes (that were in his possession) because he was morally obliged to do everything in his power to protect the safety of his sources. '[I] decided it was a moral issue... If their identity had become known in the Sikh community, they would have been killed. There is no doubt in my mind about that.'"

Murdered witnesses
Tara Singh Hayer, the publisher of the Indo-Canadian Times and a member of the Order of British Columbia, provided an affidavit to the RCMP in 1995 claiming that he was present during a conversation in which Bagri admitted his involvement in the bombings. While at the London offices of fellow Sikh newspaper publisher Tarsem Singh Purewal, Hayer claimed he overheard a meeting between Purewal and Bagri in which Bagri stated that "if everything had gone as planned the plane would have blown up at Heathrow airport with no passengers on it. But because the plane was a half-hour to three quarters of an hour late, it blew up over the ocean." On 24 January that same year, Purewal was killed near the offices of the Des Pardes newspaper in Southall, England, leaving Hayer as the only other witness.

On 18 November 1998, Hayer was shot dead while getting out of his car in the garage of his home in Surrey, British Columbia. Hayer had survived an earlier attempt on his life in 1988, but was paralysed and used a wheelchair. As a consequence of his murder, the affidavit was inadmissible as evidence. This was later cited as a reason why the suspects in the bombing were eventually acquitted in 2005.

CSIS connection
During an interview with Bagri on 28 October 2000, RCMP agents described Surjan Singh Gill as an agent for CSIS, saying the reason that he resigned from the Babbar Khalsa was because his CSIS handlers told him to pull out.

After the subsequent failure of CSIS to stop the bombing of Flight 182, the head of CSIS was replaced by Reid Morden. In an interview for CBC Television's news program The National, Morden claimed that CSIS "dropped the ball" in its handling of the case. A Security Intelligence Review Committee cleared CSIS of any wrongdoing. However, that report remains secret to this day. As of June 2003, the Canadian government continued to insist that there was no mole involved.

Public inquiry
On 1 May 2006, the Crown-in-Council, on the advice of Prime Minister Stephen Harper, announced the launch of a full public inquiry into the bombing, headed by retired Supreme Court Justice John Major, to find investigate the events surrounding the bombing and the subsequent investigation, as well as to identify gaps in Canada's security and intelligence system.

Initiated later in June, the Commission of Inquiry into the Investigation of the Bombing of Air India Flight 182 was to examine how Canadian law restricted funding terrorist groups, how well witness protection is provided in terrorist cases, if Canada needed to upgrade its airport security, and if issues of co-operation between the RCMP, CSIS, and other law enforcement agencies had been resolved. It was to also provide a forum wherein families of the victims could testify on the impact of the bombing and would not repeat any criminal trials.

The inquiry's findings were published on 17 June 2010 in its final report, Air India Flight 182: A Canadian Tragedy. The report was 4,000 pages long, with 5 volumes and 64 recommendations. Major concluded that a "cascading series of errors" by Crown ministries, the RCMP, and CSIS allowed the terrorist attack to take place. He called for the Canadian government's National Security Advisor to be given responsibility for preventing conflict between agencies, as well as calling for a national director of terrorism prosecutions, a new coordinator of witness protection for terrorism cases, and broad changes to close the gaps in airport security.

As per recommendation of the inquiry, Stephen Harper announced in the media, a week after the report and on the 25th anniversary of the disaster, that he would "acknowledge the catastrophic failures of intelligence, policing and air security that led to the bombing, and the prosecutorial lapses that followed" and deliver an apology on behalf of the sitting Cabinet of Canada.

Legacy

"A Canadian tragedy"

On 23 June 2005, 20 years after the downing of Air India Flight 182, Prime Minister Paul Martin attended a memorial service in Ahakista, West Cork, Ireland, with victims' families to grieve. This would be the first time a Canadian Prime Minister had visited the Irish memorial, which was built right after the bombing. Governor General Adrienne Clarkson, on the advice of Martin, declared the anniversary a national day of mourning. During the anniversary observances, Martin said that the bombing was a Canadian problem, not a foreign problem, saying, 

Ujjal Dosanjh, a moderate Sikh who had been attacked in a prelude to the Air India bombing, was by this time a member of Martin's cabinet as federal Minister of Health, and had previously in the interim been Premier of British Columbia.

In May 2007, Angus Reid Strategies released the results of public opinion polling of whether Canadians viewed the Air India bombing as a Canadian or Indian tragedy and whom they blamed: 48% of respondents considered the bombing as a Canadian event, while 22% thought it was a mostly Indian affair; 34% of those asked felt both CSIS and airport security personnel deserved a great deal of the blame in addition to 27% who believed the RCMP were largely to blame; 18% mentioned Transport Canada.

Ken MacQueen and John Geddes of Maclean's said that the Air India bombing has been referred to as "Canada's 9/11." They disagreed, however, stating the following:

Memorials 
Memorials were erected in Canada and elsewhere to commemorate the victims. In 1986, a monument was unveiled in Ahakista, Ireland, on the first anniversary of the bombing.

Subsequently, a groundbreaking occurred on 11 August 2006 at a playground that would form part of a memorial in Stanley Park, Vancouver, British Columbia.

Another memorial was unveiled on 22 June 2007 in Humber Bay Park East, Toronto, Ontario; many of the bombing victims had lived in Toronto. The memorial features a sundial, the base of which consists of stones from all provinces and territories of Canada, as well as the countries of the other victims, and a wall, oriented toward Ireland and bearing the names of the dead.

A third Canadian memorial opened in Ottawa in 2014. A fourth memorial was unveiled in Lachine, Montreal on the 26th anniversary of the tragedy. There are no memorials in India as of yet.

Recognition in media
In film and television:
 CBC Television announced the start of filming for Flight 182, a documentary about the tragedy directed by Sturla Gunnarsson. Its title was changed to Air India 182 before premiering at the Hot Docs Canadian International Documentary Festival in Toronto in April 2008. It subsequently premiered on CBC Television in June.
 The crash was featured in season 5 of the Canadian-made, internationally distributed documentary series Mayday, on the episode "Air India: Explosive Evidence".

Many journalists have commented on the bombing throughout the decades since it occurred.
 In 2006, International bestselling author Anita Rau Badami published Can you hear the nightbird call?, a fiction novel that explored the lives and events leading up to the Air India bombing, which incorporated factual details of the tragedy.
Eight months after the bombing, The Province newspaper reporter Salim Jiwa published Death of Air India Flight 182.
 Loss of Faith: How the Air-India Bombers Got Away With Murder was published by the Vancouver Sun reporter Kim Bolan in May 2005.
 Jiwa and fellow reporter Don Hauka published Margin of Terror: A reporter's twenty-year odyssey covering the tragedies of the Air India bombing in May 2007.
 In her short story, "The Management of Grief," Indian-born American writer Bharati Mukherjee uses fiction to explore the enduring grief of relatives of Air India 182 victims. "The Management of Grief" was originally published in the fiction collection The Middleman and Other Stories. Mukherjee also co-authored The Sorrow and the Terror: The Haunting Legacy of the Air India Tragedy (1987) with her husband, Clark Blaise.
 Inspired by mainstream Canada's cultural denial of the Air India tragedy, Neil Bissoondath wrote The Soul of All Great Designs.
 In 2013, Canadian poet Renée Sarojini Saklikar created a collection of memorial and response poems, Children of Air India: Un/authorized Exhibits and Interjections.
 The Air India bombing is central to the plot of the novel All Inclusive by Toronto-based author Farzana Doctor.
 Dr. Chandra Sankurathri, husband and father of Air India victims, wrote an autobiography called Ray of Hope.

Other recognition 
The Pada memorial awards at Laurentian University were established in honour of victim Vishnu Pada, the husband of Lata Pada, Indian-born Canadian choreographer and Bharatanatyam dancer.

The University of Manitoba created the Donald George Lougheed Memorial Scholarship in honour of Air India victim Donald George Lougheed. It is awarded to computer engineering students.

Laxminarayan and Padmini Turlapati, the parents of victims Sanjay and Deepak Turlapati, created the Sanjay Deepak Children Trust.

Sankurathri Foundation was established by Dr. Chandra Sekhar Sankurathri in Kakinada, Andhra Pradesh in memory of his wife Manjari, son Sri Kiran and daughter Sarada, victims of the Air India Flight 182. SF implements educational programs through Sarada Vidyalayam, health care programs through Sri Kiran Institute of Ophthalmology and disaster relief programs through Spandana.

See also

 Timeline of the Air India Flight 182 affair
 1984 anti-Sikh riots
 Air India Flight 112 alleged bomb plot
 Avianca Flight 203
 Eisha Marjara
 Indian Airlines flight 814 hijacking
 Iraqi Airways Flight 163
 Itavia Flight 870
 Japan Air Lines Flight 123
 Lata Pada
 List of accidents and incidents involving commercial aircraft
 Metrojet Flight 9268
 Narita Airport Bombing, a bombing that occurred on the same day at Tokyo Narita Airport. Luggage that came from the same person in Vancouver that bought the ticket for Flight 182 was being loaded onto another Air India jet when the bomb exploded when being loaded onto the aircraft, killing two baggage handlers. 
 Operation Blue Star
 Pan Am Flight 103
 Sikhism in Canada
 Terrorism in Canada
 Timeline of airliner bombing attacks
Cubana Flight 455
1933 United Airlines Boeing 247 mid-air explosion, the first case of an aircraft being bombed.

References

Citations

Sources 
 Honourable Mr. Justice B. N. Kirpal (Judge, High Court of Delhi). Indian Government Report of the Court Investigating the accident of Air India Boeing 747 Aircraft VT-EFO, "Kanishka" on 23 June 1985 (PDF) (Archive Archive 2). 26 February 1986.

Further reading
 Somani, Alia Rehana. "Broken Passages and Broken Promises: Reconstructing the Komagata Maru and Air India Cases" (PhD thesis) (Archive). School of Graduate and Postdoctoral Studies, University of Western Ontario, 2012.
Air India Flight 182 Accident Report Canadian and India – Canadian and Indian technical reports.

External links

 2010 Final Report Air India Commission – Government of Canada
 The Verdict – Reasons for Judgment, R. v Malik and Bagri
 Background on Air India bombing – CBC.ca
 Aftermath of Air India – www.Canada.com Air India archives
 CBC Digital Archives – The Air India Investigation

Passenger lists
 Final passenger and crew list — Does not indicate locations or distinguish crew from passengers
 "PASSENGERS AND CREW ABOARD AIR-INDIA JETLINER." Associated Press at The New York Times. 24 June 1985 — Preliminary list with crew members indicated and locations of U.S. passengers indicated, Alternate version

 
1985 in Canada
1985 in Ireland
1985 in India
1991 in law
2003 in law
2005 in law
Accidents and incidents involving the Boeing 747
Airliner bombings
Anti-Hindu sentiment
Aviation accidents and incidents in 1985
Aviation accidents and incidents in Ireland
British people murdered abroad
Canadian people murdered abroad
Canada–Ireland relations
Canada–India relations
India–Ireland relations
Indian people murdered abroad
Marine salvage operations
Mass murder in 1985
Mass murder in Ireland
Terrorist incidents in Europe in 1985
182
June 1985 crimes
Sikh terrorism
Sikh terrorism in Canada
Terrorist incidents in North America in 1985
Terrorist incidents in Canada in the 1980s
Aviation accidents and incidents in the Atlantic Ocean